Bram Stoker's Dracula is a 1993 pinball machine released by Williams. It is based on the 1992 film of the same name.

Description
The game was characterized by its unusual blood-red DMD display (most other games at the time used orange for their color) as well as a "Multi-Multi-Ball" mode, where up to three different multiball variations could be active at the same time, with each successive active mode providing a jackpot multiplier of up to 3x. It also featured a unique variation on the usual multiball mode known as "Mist Multiball," where a magnet would drag a pinball across the playfield and the player would be required to knock it loose from the magnet's grasp to start the mode.

Gameplay 
The objective of the game is to destroy Dracula, his concubines, his werewolves, and his bats. There are a series of strategies published online by avid fans of the game to help others complete these tasks as quickly as possible.

Digital Versions  
A licensed digital version of the table had been released for The Pinball Arcade to end its third season of DLC for several platforms. It was available because the license of Bally/Williams Pinball expired on June 30, 2018 due to not releasing the new tables

References

External links
BSD promo video

Pinball machines based on films
Williams pinball machines
1993 pinball machines
Works based on Dracula